Xonxa Dam, is a composite zoned earthfill/rockfill dam situated on the White Kei River in Eastern Cape, South Africa. The dam serves mainly for irrigation purposes and its hazard potential has been ranked high (3).

See also
 List of reservoirs and dams in South Africa
 List of rivers of South Africa

References 

 List of South African Dams from the Department of Water and Sanitation

Dams in South Africa
Dams completed in 1974